Sultanum Begum ( 1516 – 1593), also known as Kadam Ali Soltan Khanum, was the first wife and chief consort of the second Safavid king Tahmasp I. She was the mother of her husband's successor, Ismail II, and the mother of Mohammad Khodabanda, who reigned from 1578 until his overthrow in 1587.

Life

Sultanum Begum was the daughter of Isa Beg Mawsillu of the Aq Quyunlu. Like Tahmasp's mother Tajlu Khanum, Sultanum belonged to the Turcoman Mawsillu tribe and was a maternal third cousin of her husband. Musa Soltan, governor of Azerbaijan was his brother. Tahmasp had most likely married her around the time of his father, Ismail I's death. She became his principal wife and bore him two sons, including Mohammad Khodabanda who was born in 1532, during the early years of the Shamlu-Ustalju regency, when Tahmasp himself was only eighteen years old, and Ismail II, born in 1537.

Sultanum Begum rose to become the harem's leader after Tajlu Khanum's exile to Shiraz in 1540. She had an independent royal court and her vizier was Khwaja Ibrahim Khalil. She also gained the honorific title of Mahd-i Ulya. She owned the tiyul and muqarariyat (perpetual fixed assignation) payable on lands in Western Khurasan.

Reign of her sons 
She mainted her strong position during the reign of Ismail II as her tribe, Mawsillu, also supported him. She was alive during her son Mohammad Khodabanda's and grandson Abbas I's reigns.

References

Safavid royal consorts
16th-century Iranian women
Iranian Turkmen people
1516 births
1593 deaths
16th-century people of Safavid Iran
Mawsillu
Burials at Imam Reza Shrine